The Battle of Salvore is a painting by Domenico Tintoretto depicting a fictitious 1177 conflict between the Republic of Venice and the Holy Roman Empire.

1605 paintings